Kwenzokuhle Ndumiso Blose (born 12 May 1997) is a South African rugby union player for the  in Super Rugby and  in the Currie Cup and the Rugby Challenge. His regular position is prop.

References

South African rugby union players
Living people
1997 births
Zulu people
People from eDumbe Local Municipality
Rugby union props
Western Province (rugby union) players
South Africa Under-20 international rugby union players
Stormers players
Rugby union players from KwaZulu-Natal